"Unicorn Wizard" is a song written and performed by American comedy rock band Ninja Sex Party. The song was released as the band's fourth single on October 25, 2012, and was included as a track on the band's second studio album Strawberries and Cream.

Music video
A music video for the song was uploaded to YouTube on October 25, 2012. The video, which was directed by Jim Turner and Annie Quick, features animated sequences produced by Newgrounds animators Zach Hadel and Chris O'Neill.

The video is the eighth most viewed upload on the channel, with 6.3 million views as of June 2019.

Track listings

Reception
The song has received positive reviews. John Eckes of the website One of Us listed "Unicorn Wizard" as the second best Ninja Sex Party song, writing that "the whole song is dramatic and yet hilarious. They really pushed their imaginations on this one and I think it shows in every second of this".

Personnel
Ninja Sex Party
Dan Avidan – vocals
Brian Wecht – keyboards, production
Rachel Bitney Wecht – guest vocals

Charts

Release history

References

2012 songs
2012 singles
Ninja Sex Party songs